Zonkwa (Jju: A̱zunkwa) is the Zangon Kataf Local Government Area as well as the Bajju Chiefdom headquarters, in southern Kaduna state in the Middle Belt region of Nigeria.

Geography

Landscape
Zonkwa possesses an elevation of 798m.

Climate

Demographics

People

Indigenous

The indigenous and predominant group in the town are the Bajju people. This town also serves as their headquarters.

Other
Other groups found in significant populations include the Atyap, Igbo, Bakulu, Hausa, Yoruba, Anghan, and other Nigerian peoples.

Politics

Administrative units
Zonkwa is a second-order administrative division with the following 10 towns/villages:
 Zonkwa
 Samaru Kataf (Tyap: Cenkwon)
 Madauci
 Masat
 Fadiya Yadsanu
 Fadiya Mugu
 Fadiya Busan
 Fadiya Bakut
 Fadan Kaje
 Ungwan Gaya

Notable people
 Katung Aduwak, cinematographer
 Nuhu Bature, paramount ruler

See also
 List of villages in Kaduna State

References

External links

Populated places in Kaduna State